Klondike is an unincorporated community in Oconto County, Wisconsin, United States. The community is located at the intersection of Oconto County Highways ZZ, B, and Z, in the town of Brazeau, Wisconsin. It is located at latitude 45.068 and longitude -88.16 at an elevation of 791 feet (mean sea level).

Images

Notes

Unincorporated communities in Oconto County, Wisconsin
Unincorporated communities in Wisconsin